The 2021 AFC Champions League qualifying play-offs was played from 7 April to 23 June 2021. A total of 15 teams competed in the qualifying play-offs to decide seven of the 40 places in the group stage of the 2021 AFC Champions League.

Teams
The following 15 teams, split into two regions (West Region and East Region), entered the qualifying play-offs, consisting of two rounds:
2 teams entered in the preliminary round.
13 teams entered in the play-off round.

Format

In the qualifying play-offs, each tie was played as a single match. Extra time and penalty shoot-out were used to decide the winner if necessary.

Schedule
The schedule of each round was as follows. On 11 March 2021, the AFC announced that the preliminary round and play-off round matches in the East Region, which were originally scheduled to be played on 7 April and 14 April 2021, had been postponed to June/July 2021, and were played in centralised venues of their respective group stage matches.

Bracket

The bracket of the qualifying play-offs for each region was determined based on each team's association ranking and their seeding within their association, with the team from the higher-ranked association hosting the match in the West Region. Teams from the same association could not be placed into the same tie. The eight winners of the play-off round (four each from both West Region and East Region) advanced to the group stage to join the 32 direct entrants.

Play-off West 1
 AGMK advanced to Group A.

Play-off West 2
 Al-Quwa Al-Jawiya advanced to Group B.

Play-off West 3
 Foolad advanced to Group D.

Play-off West 4
 Al-Wahda advanced to Group E.

Play-off East 1
 Kaya–Iloilo  advanced to Group F.

Play-off East 2
 Cerezo Osaka advanced to Group J after Shan United and Melbourne City withdrew from the competition.

Play-off East 3
 Pohang Steelers and  Ratchaburi Mitr Phol advanced to Group G after Jiangsu ceased operations.

Play-off East 4
 Daegu FC advanced to Group I and  Chiangrai United advanced to Group H.

Preliminary round

Summary
A total of two teams will play in the preliminary round.

|+East Region

|}

East Region

Play-off round

Summary
A total of 14 teams played in the preliminary round 2: 13 teams which entered in this round, and one winner of the preliminary round.

|+West Region

|}

|+East Region

|}

West Region

East Region

Notes

References

External links

AFC Champions League 2021, stats.the-AFC.com

1
April 2021 sports events in Asia
June 2021 sports events in Asia